Carmen Marcu (born 30 August 2001) is a Romanian footballer who plays as a forward for Olimpia Cluj and the Romania women's national team.

Career
She made her debut for the Romania national team on 23 October 2020 against Lithuania, coming on as a substitute for Laura Rus.

International goals

References

2001 births
Living people
Women's association football forwards
Romanian women's footballers
Romania women's international footballers
FCU Olimpia Cluj players